Crais may refer to:

 Bialar Crais, a fictional character from the Farscape universe
 Robert Crais, an American author of detective fiction